Patrick McGunigal (May 30, 1876 – January 19, 1936) was a sailor in the United States Navy who received the Medal of Honor for his actions during World War I.

Biography
McGunigal was born in Hubbard, Ohio on May 30, 1876.  He was assigned as a Ship's Fitter First Class on board the armored cruiser USS Huntington at the time of his Medal of Honor action (see below) in 1917.  He was promoted to the warrant officer rank of carpenter on July 20, 1918. He was subsequently assigned to the Naval Air Stations at Montauk and Rockaway Beach, New York.  He retired from the Navy in December 1920.  

Patrick McGunigal retired from the Navy in December 1920 and died January 19, 1936.  He is buried in Arlington National Cemetery Arlington, Virginia. His grave can be found in section 6, lot 8674, map grid W/21.5.

Medal of Honor citation
Rank and organization: Shipfitter First Class, U.S. Navy. Born: 30 May 1876, Hubbard, Ohio. Accredited to: Ohio. G.O. No.: 341, 1917. 

Citation:

On the morning of 17 September 1917, while the U.S.S. Huntington was passing through the war zone, a kite balloon was sent up with Lt. (j.g.) H. W. Hoyt, U.S. Navy, as observer. When the balloon was about 400 feet in the air, the temperature suddenly dropped, causing the balloon to descend about 200 feet, when it was struck by a squall. The balloon was hauled to the ship's side, but the basket trailed in the water and the pilot was submerged. McGunigal, with great daring, climbed down the side of the ship, jumped to the ropes leading to the basket, and cleared the tangle enough to get the pilot out of them. He then helped the pilot to get clear, put a bowline around him, and enabled him to be hauled to the deck. A bowline was lowered to McGunigal and he was taken safely aboard.

See also

List of Medal of Honor recipients
List of Medal of Honor recipients for World War I

References

External links

US People: Patrick McGunigal (1876-1936)

United States Navy Medal of Honor recipients
United States Navy sailors
United States Navy personnel of World War I
Burials at Arlington National Cemetery
People from Hubbard, Ohio
1876 births
Military personnel from Ohio
1936 deaths
World War I recipients of the Medal of Honor
Non-combat recipients of the Medal of Honor